Kwilu District was a district of the Belgian Congo and the Democratic Republic of the Congo. It roughly corresponded to the present province of Kwilu.

Location

The Free State was annexed by Belgium in 1908 as the Belgian Congo.
In 1933 the original four provinces were reorganized into six provinces, named after their capitals, and the central government assumed more control.
The Congo-Kasaï province was split into Léopoldville and Lusambo (Kasai).
The number of districts was reduced to 15.
A map of the districts in 1933 shows Kwango District in Léopoldville Province.
It is bordered by Portuguese possessions to the south, Bas-Congo District to the west, Lac Léopold II District to the north and Kasai District to the east.

By 1954 Kwango District had been split into a smaller Kwango District in the south and Kwilu District in the north.
Kwilu was bordered by Lac Leopold II District to the north, Kasai District to the east and Kwango District to the south and west.
It covered essentially the same territory as the present Kwilu Province. 

Post-independence

Léopoldville Province was divided in 1963–1966 into the provinces of Congo Central, Kwilu, Kwango, and Mai-Ndombe.
Bandundu Province was formed in 1966 by merging Kwilu, Kwango and Mai-Ndombe.
As of 2008 Kwilu District contained the territories of Bagata, Bulungu, Masi-Manimba, Gungu and Idiofa.
Bandundu Province was broken up into provinces formed from its districts in 2015.
Kwilu Province was formed from the Kwilu district and the independently administered cities of Bandundu and Kikwit.
Bandundu retained its status as a provincial capital.

Maps

See also

Districts of the Belgian Congo
Districts of the Democratic Republic of the Congo

References

Sources

Districts of the Belgian Congo
Districts of Bandundu Province